Danny Boy is a studio album by country music artist Ray Price. It was released in 1967 by Columbia Records (catalog no. CL-2677).

The album debuted on Billboard magazine's country album chart on May 26, 1967, peaked at No. 3, and remained on the chart for a total of 35 weeks. The album included two singles that became Top 10 hits: "Soft Rain" (No. 3) and "Danny Boy" (No. 9).

AllMusic gave the album two stars. However, AllMusic critic Dylan Hope gave the album five stars, found the earlier two-star rating to be "baffling", and described the album "a beautiful testament to a wonderful voice."

Track listing
Side A
 "Danny Boy"
 "Greensleeves"
 "Across the Wide Missouri"
 "Soft Rain"
 "Pretend"

Side B
 "Spanish Eyes"
 "What's Come Over My Baby"
 "Crazy"
 "Born to Lose"
 "Vaya Con Dios"

References

1967 albums
Ray Price (musician) albums
Columbia Records albums